Doménica Alejandra González Palau (born 12 February 1996) is an Ecuadorian former tennis player.

González has won one singles and two doubles titles on the ITF Circuit in her career. On 5 November 2012, she reached her best singles ranking of world No. 669. On 29 October 2012, she peaked at No. 697 in the doubles rankings.

Playing for Ecuador Fed Cup team, Guayaquil-born González has a win–loss record of 17–6.

ITF finals

Singles: 2 (1–1)

Doubles: 2 (2–0)

Junior Grand Slam finals

Girls' doubles

References

External links

 
 
 

1996 births
Living people
Sportspeople from Guayaquil
Ecuadorian female tennis players
Tennis players at the 2011 Pan American Games
Tennis players at the 2014 Summer Youth Olympics
Pan American Games competitors for Ecuador
Competitors at the 2010 South American Games
20th-century Ecuadorian women
21st-century Ecuadorian women